"Look Right Through" is a song by American record producer Storm Queen, vocals by Damon C. Scott. It was first released on 19 October 2010, with two remix packages released through Defected in February 2012. On 3 November 2013, Ministry of Sound re-released the song in Ireland and Britain including new remixes. The vocal remix by MK was hugely successful in the United Kingdom, and helped the track enter at number one on the UK Singles Chart and UK Dance Chart simultaneously on 10 November 2013.

Music video
The video for the original track was released on 20 December 2011. A music video to accompany the release of the MK remix was first released onto YouTube on 23 September 2013 at a total length of three minutes and eleven seconds. Set in the 1920s, it shows an eyepatch-wearing man dressed as a white lion in a suit. After leaving his hotel room, he dances to get attention from women. The video was filmed at The Cadogan Hotel, located in Sloane Street, Knightsbridge, London.

Critical reception
Robert Copsey of Digital Spy gave the song a positive review stating:
 
"It's the musical fairytale of the digital age: A dance track is popular on the underground, becomes the go-to song on Europe's party islands, turns into an online hit and is eventually re-worked for radio stations, which launches it into the upper echelons of the top 40. The latest to undergo a chart-friendly makeover is 'Look Right Through', which comes courtesy of US DJ and one half of house duo Metro Arena Morgan Geist, who has aptly named himself Storm Queen for the occasion. In this case, Geist's fairy godmother (are you keeping up?) is Mark 'MK' Kinchen, who has re-swizzed the track alongside a full vocal courtesy of Damon C Scott – the knight in shining armour, if you will (we'll stop that now). "Seven long years of moving through the streets, letting people in/ But they don't talk to me, they look right through" he sings over a bobbing house line, finger-snapping beats and a looping chorus that quickly lodges deep in the brain. The result, like all fairytales, already sounds like a classic."

Track listings

Charts and certifications

Weekly charts

Year-end charts

Certifications

Release history

References

2010 singles
2013 singles
Storm Queen songs
UK Singles Chart number-one singles
UK Independent Singles Chart number-one singles
2010 songs
Ministry of Sound singles
Deep house songs
American house music songs